The Department of Island Territories is a now-defunct New Zealand government department that was tasked with administrating New Zealand's three Pacific Islands territories—the Cook Islands (until 1965), Niue, and Tokelau, and the country's League of Nations mandate Samoa (until 1962). It was established on 3 October 1919 under the "External Affairs Bill" as the Department of External Affairs. In 1943, the Department was renamed the Department of Island Territories after a separate Department of External Affairs was created to conduct the country's external relations. In 1975, the Department was dissolved and its functions were absorbed back into the Ministry of Foreign Affairs, the successor to the External Affairs Department.

The Department was headed by a Minister of Island Territories who oversaw the Resident-Commissioners of the Cook Islands and Niue, and the Administrator of the Tokelau Islands. The Island Territories Department was responsible for the formulation and development of New Zealand government policy towards its Island Territories. The Department's other functions included transmitting advice and assistance from other New Zealand government departments to local Island governments, operating the ship GMV Moana Roa, and acting as a purchasing agent for the Island Territories. The Department had offices in both the capital Wellington and the country's largest city Auckland.

List of ministers
The following ministers have held the office of Minister of Island Territories.

Key

Notes

References

Further reading
An eye, an ear and a voice: 50 years in New Zealand’s external relations edited by Malcolm Templeton (1993, Ministry of Foreign Affairs and Trade, Wellington NZ) .

Island Territories
I
I
I
Ministries established in 1919